is a Japanese actress, tarento and former idol. She is a former member of the girl group Nogizaka46.

Life and career
Akimoto was born in Tokyo on August 20, 1993. Her family moved to Saitama Prefecture, where she was raised, when she was 7 months old. She was the vice-president of the student council in middle school and was active in the home economics and cooking clubs. In high school, she was the student council president. In her third year of high school, she was informed about the Nogizaka46 first generation member auditions and recruitment. However, Akimoto's career goals at the time were closer towards being a television presenter or actress and she was not actively interested in becoming an idol. She ended up signing up for the auditions on the final deadline date when she stumbled upon the news on her phone.

Akimoto passed the auditions on August 21, 2011, becoming one of the first generation members and a temporary main selection member. However, due to her studies and obligations, she was not active with the rest of the members until she graduated from high school in April 2012. Akimoto enrolled in university, but against her parents' wishes she returned to Nogizaka46, training to prepare for her debut. She was present at almost all Nogizakatte, Doko? studio recordings and Nogizaka46 live concerts as a trainee.

In October 2012, Akimoto was selected as a main selection member for the fourth Nogizaka46 single, "Seifuku no Mannequin", during the recording of a Nogizakatte, Doko? episode, marking her unexpected debut as an official member of Nogizaka46. She debuted as an actress in the television drama Bad Boys J in April 2013. , Akimoto is active as a regular main selection member of Nogizaka46. She is also active as a television personality, with numerous appearances on variety shows as a panelist, guest and assistant MC.

On August 14, 2019, Akimoto was named the next captain of Nogizaka46, replacing Reika Sakurai.

Akimoto announced her graduation from Nogizaka46 on January 7, 2023. Her graduation concert was held on February 26, 2023. She is the last first generation member to leave the group. Third generation member Minami Umezawa took her place as captain.

On March 1, 2023, Akimoto announced her affiliation with Japan Music Entertainment.

Discography

Singles with Nogizaka46

Albums with Nogizaka46

Other featured songs

Filmography

Television

Bibliography

Photobooks
 Manatsu no Kiatsu Haichi (July 28, 2017, Tokumashoten) 
 Shiawase ni Shitai (April 8, 2020, Takeshobo)

References

External links
 
 
 

Living people
1993 births
Japanese idols
Japanese women singers
J-pop singers
21st-century Japanese actresses
Japanese television personalities
Nogizaka46 members
People from Saitama Prefecture